"I Want It All" is a song by American electropop duo Dangerous Muse, released on December 15, 2009. The music video was directed by Greko Sklavounos. This song was released as the first single from the band's debut album.

Track listings

I Want It All EP
 "I Want It All" - 3:37
 "I Want It All (Instrumental)" - 3:36
 "I Want It All (Video)" - 3:41

I Want It All Remix EP
"I Want It All (Tracy Young Club Mix)" - 9:56
"I Want It All (Jake Shanahan & E-Marce Remix)" - 5:48
"I Want It All (DJ D-Major & Lindsay Luv Remix)" - 4:50
"I Want It All (Apres Garde Remix)" - 7:30
"I Want It All (Ian Nieman Club Mix)" - 7:01

I Want It All Remixes 2 EP
"I Want It All (Blazing Lazer Mix)" - 3:12
"I Want It All (Big White Ego Mix)" - 4:04
"I Want It All (Automatic Panic vs. DJ Cat NYC Remix)" - 4:50
"I Want It All (Dismantled Remix)" - 4:38
"I Want It All (Blush Response Remix)" - 5:51

External links
 The official Dangerous Muse site 
 Dangerouse Muse's MySpace site

2009 songs
2009 singles
Electropop songs